Varzaqan County is in East Azerbaijan province, Iran. The capital of the county is the city of Varzaqan. At the 2006 census, the county's population was 46,833 in 10,766 households. The following census in 2011 counted 45,708 people in 12,228 households. At the 2016 census, the county's population was 52,650 in 16,273 households.

Administrative divisions

The population history of Varzaqan County's administrative divisions over three consecutive censuses is shown in the following table. The latest census shows two districts, seven rural districts, and two cities.

References

 

Counties of East Azerbaijan Province